The official 2013/2014 snooker world ranking points for the professional snooker players on the World Snooker Main Tour in the 2013–14 season are based on performances in ranking and minor-ranking tournaments over a two-year rolling period. The total points from the 2011/2012 and 2012/2013 seasons set the rankings at the start of 2013/2014 season and are updated after every tournament carrying ranking points. As points are accrued from tournaments in the current season, the points from the corresponding tournaments from two seasons ago are dropped. The rankings set the official seedings at the start of the season and at six further points during the season. The total points accumulated by the cut-off dates for the revised seedings are based on all the points up to that date in the 2013/2014 season, all of the points from the 2012/2013 season, and the points from the 2011/2012 season that have not yet been dropped.

Seeding revisions

Ranking points 
{| class="wikitable sortable" style="text-align: center; font-size:90%;"
|-
! rowspan="2" scope=col class=unsortable | No.
! rowspan="2" scope=col width="35pt" class=unsortable |  Ch 
! rowspan="2" scope=col width="200pt" | Player
! colspan="2" class="unsortable"| Season
! colspan="12" class="unsortable"| Tournament
! class="unsortable"| Season
! colspan="6" class="unsortable"| Cut-off point
! rowspan="2" scope=col | Total
|-
! scope=col | 11/12
! scope=col | 12/13
! scope=col | PTC
! scope=col | WUC
! scope=col | AO
! scope=col | SM
! scope=col | IO
! scope=col | IC
! scope=col | UK
! scope=col | GM
! scope=col | WEO
! scope=col | WOO
! scope=col | CO
! scope=col | WC
! scope=col | 13/14
! scope=col | 
! scope=col | 
! scope=col | 
! scope=col | 
! scope=col | 
! scope=col | 
|-

|}

Notes

References 

2013
Ranking points 2013
Ranking points 2014